Bhagavata may refer to:
 Bhagavata, a Vaishnava tradition
 Bhagavata Purana, a Hindu religious text centred on Krishna

See also 
 Devi-Bhagavata Purana, a Hindu religious text centred on the goddess Devi
 Bhagavad Gita, one of the major Hindu religious texts
 Bhagavata Mela, a dance form of Tamil Nadu
 Chaitanya Bhagavata, a hagiography of Chaitanya Mahaprabhu
 Bhagvat Singh, a Maharaja of Gondal, Gujarat